Wathan is a 2011 Maldivian war action comedy film written, edited, produced and directed by Ali Seezan. Produced under Cxanal Movies, the film stars Ali Seezan, Lufshan Shakeeb and Mariyam Siyadha in pivotal roles. The film was released on 15 September 2011.

Cast 
 Ali Seezan as Mr. Bond
 Lufshan Shakeeb as Capt. Niya
 Mariyam Siyadha as Siyadha; CID Agent
 Fiza as Aishath
 Ahmed Ziya as Ziya
 Shan as Shan
 Munaaz as Col. Abdulla Munaz
 Nadhiya Hassan as news presenter (Special appearance)
 Aishath Rishmy as Aishath Rishmy (Special appearance)
 Mariyam Azza in the item number "Dhurun Balaashey" (Special appearance)

Release and response
The film was released on 15 September 2011. Upon release the film received negative response from critics. Haveeru Daily felt the film "deceived" the audience in the name of action thriller; "I highly doubt if the project team was even sure of what kind of movie they were planning to make. It is a total mess between a serious action movie and scoop comedy". The film was further criticized for remaking several shots from Jim Abrahams's parody film, Hot Shots! Part Deux (1993).

References

2011 films
Maldivian action films
Films directed by Ali Seezan
Maldivian comedy films
Dhivehi-language films